Wilson Roberto dos Santos or simply Wilson (born August 4, 1975) is a Brazilian soccer player, a central-defender. He currently plays for Corinthians (AL).

Wilson has played in the Campeonato Brasileiro for Atlético-PR, São Paulo and Internacional.

Honours
Campeonato Paulista (2002) and Campeonato Gaúcho in three times(2002,2003 and 2004).

References

1975 births
Living people
Brazilian footballers
Club Athletico Paranaense players
São Paulo FC players
Sport Club Internacional players
Clube Atlético Bragantino players
Association football defenders
Footballers from São Paulo